Tonka is an American toy company.

Tonka may also refer to:
Tonka (film), a 1958 Disney Western
Tonka of the Gallows, a 1930 Czech movie
Tonka (fuel), a rocket fuel
Tonka (truck), a monster truck
Tonka (name)
Tonka, Tombouctou Region, a town and commune in Mali
Tonka bean (Dipteryx odorata), a type of spice
Tonka bean oil, extract from Tonka bean
Panavia Tornado A nickname given to the jet due to its virtually indestructible nature
Tonka, given name of Bully XIX (2000 – 2011), Mississippi State Bulldogs mascot (2001 – 2009), English Bulldog

See also

Tanka (disambiguation)
Toka (disambiguation)
Tonda (disambiguation)
Tonk (disambiguation)
Tonna (disambiguation)
Toska (disambiguation)
Tonka Bay, Minnesota
Ha Ha Tonka State Park, United States park
Baba Tonka Cove, Antarctican cove
Donogoo Tonka, 1936 German film
Sens & Tonka, French publishing house